Randle House, also known as the Randall House, is a historic plantation house located near Norwood, Stanly County, North Carolina. It was built about 1835, and is a two-story, transitional Federal / Greek Revival style frame I-house dwelling. It is sheathed in weatherboard and has a gable roof.  It has a gable roofed ell and attached kitchen/dining building. The front facade features a hipped roof porch.

It was added to the National Register of Historic Places in 1992.

References

Plantation houses in North Carolina
Houses on the National Register of Historic Places in North Carolina
Greek Revival houses in North Carolina
Federal architecture in North Carolina
Houses completed in 1835
Houses in Stanly County, North Carolina
National Register of Historic Places in Stanly County, North Carolina
1835 establishments in North Carolina